Failing Better Now is a 2009 offbeat comedy film about a writer who teams up with an aspiring rock star in search of his sister's cat. This film stars Justin Allen, Gavin Bellour, Lindsay Burdge and Joyce DeWitt. It was written by Jennie Allen and Keren Atzmon and directed by Keren Atzmon. The film premiered at the 2009 Long Island International Film Expo, and also showed at the 2010 Fort Lauderdale International Film Festival.

References

External links
 
 
 

2009 films
Films about writers
2009 comedy films